FabricLive.88 is a DJ mix album by English DJ Flava D. The album was released as the eighty-eighth album in the FabricLive Mix Series.

Track listing

External links

 at Fabric

References

Fabric (club) albums
2014 compilation albums